Muravka is a rural locality (a selo) in Rabochy posyolok Bureya of Bureysky District, Amur Oblast, Russia. The population was 75 as of 2018. There are 6 streets.

Geography 
Muravka is located 29 km west of Novobureysky (the district's administrative centre) by road. Novoraychikhinsk is the nearest rural locality.

References 

Rural localities in Bureysky District